Lindsay Goldberg  (LGLLC) is an American private equity firm focused on leveraged buyout and growth capital investments in middle-market companies in such sectors as consumer products, commodity-based manufacturing, energy services, business services, healthcare, financial services, energy transmission and waste disposal.

Synopsis
LGLLC, which is based in New York City, was founded in 2001 by Alan Goldberg, who had previously served as chairman and CEO of Morgan Stanley Private Equity (later Metalmark Capital) and Robert Lindsay, who played a central role in the Bessemer Trust private equity business, serving most recently as Managing General Partner since 1991. Goldberg and Lindsay had worked together in the 1980s at Morgan Stanley. They were founding members of the private equity business in 1984.

The firm has raised approximately $17 billion since inception, across five funds. The firm raised $2 billion for its first fund in 2002. In 2006, the firm completed fundraising for its second fund with $3.1 billion of investor commitments. In 2008, Lindsay Goldberg commenced raising its third fund with a target of $4.0 billion. As of November 2015, $3.4 billion had been raised toward its fourth fund.  As of July 2020, $3.4 billion had been raised toward its fifth fund.

Holdings

Bedrock Industries, which was formed 23 October 2015 by LGLLC, is "focused on owning and operating metals, mining and natural resources" companies and assets. It operates as a holding company, and owns such properties as Stelco in conjunction with Fairfax Financial.
Creation Technologies, a Vancouver-based service supplier to OEMs. The firm had as of August 2019 roughly 3,000 employees across the USMCA countries and China.
Bilcare Research, a Swiss employer of 1,000 people valued at 300 million euros "produces plastic packaging used in the pharmaceutical, consumer goods and chip card manufacturing industries".
MMS Holdings, data-focused clinical research organization (CRO) that supports the pharmaceutical, biotech, and medical device industries.

Advisors
Lindsay Goldberg has developed affiliate partnerships with a number of influential individuals and businesses in order to extend their reach, both geographically and by industries.  These partners include:
 Tony Knowles, American politician, 7th Governor of Alaska
 Gary Edson, former advisor to the George W. Bush administration
 Stephen Jansen, former Vice Chairman of Aon Corporation
 Patrick Moore, former CEO of Smurfit-Stone Container
 Leonard Riggs, founder and former CEO of EmCare

References

External links
 
 List of investments

Private equity firms of the United States
Financial services companies established in 2001